The Women's road race B event at the 2012 Summer Paralympics took place on September 8 at Brands Hatch. Thirteen riders from ten different nations competed. The race distance was 80 km.

Results
DNF = Did Not Finish.

Source:

References

Women's road race B
2012 in women's road cycling